Philipp Hochmair (German: [ˈfɪǀɪp ˈhoːxmɑɪɐ]); born 16 October 1973) is an Austrian theater, film and television actor.

Early life 
Hochmair grew up in Vienna (Austria) where he discovered his passion for literature, film and theater. He studied acting at the Max Reinhardt Seminar in Vienna in the master class of Klaus Maria Brandauer and at the Conservatoire National Supérieur d'Art Dramatique in Paris.

Career

Theater 
From 2003 to 2009 Hochmair was engaged at the Viennese Burgtheater (admitted in the gallery of honor). When he left the Burgtheater in 2009, he worked at the Thalia Theater in Hamburg until 2016. Apart from this, he had engagements at the Schauspielhaus Hamburg, Staatstheater Hannover, Volksbühne Berlin and at the Zürich Schauspielhaus.

Movies and TV 
He has played in Austrian and German movies, TV-films and television series, including Die Manns – ein Jahrhundertroman (directed by Heinrich Breloer: 30th International Emmy Awards), The Shine of the Day (by Tizza Covi and Rainer Frimmel), Die Auslöschung (director: Nicholas Leytner), Tomcat (by Händl Klaus) and Animals (directed by Greg Zglinksi).

Candelaria - Ein kubanischer Sommer (2017) is one of his first international productions, directed by Jhonny Hendrix Hinestroza. Shot in Cuba in 2016.

In the series Vorstadtweiber (2015-2022), he embodies a corrupt and cynical homosexual politician, who loses his mind and becomes a murderer.

In the third season of Charité (German-Netflix-Production, 2020), Hochmair stars as Professor Otto Prokop, an Austrian forensic pathologist who was internationally recognized for his influence on forensic medicine and research policy during German Democratic Republic.

Blind ermittelt (since 2018) centers around Hochmair's character Alexander Haller, a blind ex-commissioner.

In the Netflix-Series Freud (2019), he plays an evil count, obsessed by dark powers.

Die Wannseekonferenz (2022, directed by Matti Geschonneck) is a multi-award winning German TV docudrama: On January 20, 1942, leading representatives of the Nazi Regime meet at Wannsee in Berlin at the invitation of Reinhard Heydrich (Philipp Hochmair). The meeting will go down in history as the Wannsee Conference. The sole topic of discussion is the so-called "Final Solution of the Jewish Question" by the National Socialists: the organization of the systematic mass murder of the Jews of Europe by the millions.

Projects 
Hochmair performs his solo projects Werther! (by Goethe), The Trial  and America (both by Franz Kafka).

Jedermann Reloaded is Hochmair's rock-interpretation of Hugo von Hofmannsthal's original play Jedermann, which he performs together with his band Die Elektrohand Gottes on stage. With his band, he has also set ballads by Friedrich Schiller to music in a rock style (Schiller Balladen Rave).

In November 2018, Hochmair and his band performed Jedermann Reloaded at the Viennese St. Stephens Cathedral. All proceeds of this sold out charity went to a South African aids hospice.

Selected filmography

Film 

 1996: Lucie Aubrac by Claude Berri: German soldier
 2000: The Experiment by Oliver Hirschbiegel: Lars
 2005: Winter Journey by Hans Steinbichler: Xaver Brenninger
 2010: Day and Night by Sabine Derflinger: Mario
 2011: The Fatherless by Marie Kreutzer: Niki
 2012: The Shine of the Day by Tizza Covi and Rainer Frimmel: Philipp Hochmair
 2013: Talea by Katharina Mückstein: Stefan
 2016: Tomcat by Klaus Händl: Andreas
 2017: Animals by Greg Zglinski: Nick
 2017: Candelaria by Jhonny Hendrix Hinestroza: El Carpintero
 2019: Glück gehabt by Peter Payer: Artur
 2019: All my loving by Edward Berger: Nico 
 2019: Ich war noch niemals in New York by Philipp Stölzl: Doctor 
 2020: Das Glaszimmer by Christian Lerch: Feik

Television 

 1999-2022: Tatort: Bogdan / Jan Beckern / Peter Altmann / Paul Schemerl / Wolfgang / Schöller
 1999: Bella Block: Blinde Liebe by Sherry Hormann
 2000: The Manns - Novel of a Century by Heinrich Breloer: Golo Mann
 2003: Doppelter Einsatz: Die Wahrheit stirbt zuletzt by Dror Zahavi: Hannes Jessen
 2008: SOKO Donau: Nachts kaum Abkühlung by Erwin Keusch: Fipsi Galen
 2012: The Extinction by Nikolaus Leytner: Theo
 2013: Ein starkes Team: Die Frau des Freundes by Maris Pfeiffer: Sebastian Hauser
 2014:  by Urs Egger: Arthur von Suttner
 2014:  by Harald Sicheritz: David Sachs
 2015: Polizeiruf 110: Wendemanöver by Eoin Moore: Joseph Tischendorf
 2015: Kleine große Stimme by Wolfgang Murnberger: Hans Reschke
 2015-2022: Vorstadtweiber (TV Series): Dr. Joachim Schnitzler
 2016: Solo für Weiss: Das verschwundene Mädchen by Thomas Berger: Matthias Matter
 2017: Ein Sommer im Allgäu by : Pirmin
 2018: Deutschland 86 (TV Series) by Florian Cossen, Arne Feldhusen: Frank Winkelmann
 since 2018: Blind ermittelt by Jano Ben Chaabane, David Nawrath, Katharina Mückstein: Alexander Haller
 2019: SOKO Wien: Ritterschlag by Holger Gimpel: Joachim Kramp
 2019: Ein Dorf wehrt sich by Gabriela Zerhaus: August Eigruber
 2019: Maria Theresia (TV Series) by Robert Dornhelm: Baron von der Trenck
 2020: Freud (TV Series) by Marvin Kren: Viktor von Szápáry
 2021: Charité by Christine Hartmann: Otto Prokop
 2022: The Wannsee Conference by Matti Geschonneck: Reinhard Heydrich

Documentary 

 2020: Philipp Hochmair -  Eine Reise mit Jedermann by Bernadette Schugg, Philipp Hochmair
 2021: Jedermann und ich by Katharina Pethke
 2021: Jedermann auf Reisen by Wolfgang Tonninger

Awards and Nominations 
In 2017, Hochmair won the Diagonale Festival Award in Graz for his performance in Tomcat.

In 2019, he won the Austrian Television Award ROMY for his role Alexander Haller, the blind ex-commissioner in Blind ermittelt.

In 2022, he won the Austrian Television Award ROMY  for his role Reinhard Heydrich in The Wannsee Conference.

In 2022,  he was nominated in the category Best Actor for the German Television Award for The Wannsee Conference

References

External links 
 Official website
 Philipp Hochmair at IMDb https://www.imdb.com/name/nm0387832/
Phillip Hochmair at Schlag
Philipp Hochmair in the German National Library catalogue https://d-nb.info/gnd/129407313

1973 births
Living people
Male actors from Vienna
Austrian male stage actors
Austrian male film actors
21st-century Austrian male actors
Austrian male television actors